Premala Chavan (2 July 1918 – 8 July 2003), also known as Premalabai and Premalakaki, was an Indian politician and was a member of the Lok Sabha and the Rajya Sabha. The Founder-President of the All India Women's Cricket Association, she was involved in various other activities that contributed to the welfare of women in Indian society. Chavan is notable for holding the record for the most number of representations (four) in the Lok Sabha and the Rajya Sabha, by a female M.P. from Maharashtra.

Personal life

Chavan was born to the M. N. Rao Jagdale in the Baroda district of Gujarat. She completed her primary and secondary education at S.N.D.T. in Indore, after which she went to St. Xavier's College Bombay, where she received a Diploma in Montessori Education. Premala married Dajisaheb Chavan on 27 April 1942. She was the mother of the ex-Chief Minister of Maharashtra, Prithviraj Chavan, along with Nirupama Ajitrao Yadav and Vidlyulata Vyankatrao Ghorpade.

Political career

Lok Sabha and Rajya Sabha

Chavan was a member of the Peasants and Workers Party of Maharashtra from 1952-60. Later, she represented the Indian National Congress party in the Fifth Lok Sabha (1971–77), the Sixth Lok Sabha (1977–79), the Eighth Lok Sabha (1984–89), and the Rajya Sabha (1980–84). After her husband's death, she was elected unopposed to the Lok Sabha in a by-poll in 1973. She was re-elected from the Karad constituency for the next three terms. After the post-emergency split in the Congress, when many party veterans in the state aligned with the congress led by Devraj Urs, Chavan chose to remain with Indira Gandhi and also served as the Congress(i) State President at that time. When Indira Gandhi returned to power in 1980, she nominated Chavan to Rajya Sabha in 1981. Chavan was re-elected to the Lok Sabha from Karad in 1989. Chavan retired from politics in 1991 when Rajiv Gandhi asked her son to continue the family's political legacy in parliament.

Chavan participated in the Lok Sabha until 1991, until which point she had contested from her late constituency and served in the same capacity for all consecutive terms.

Committee experience

Chavan was a member of the Committee on Subordinate Legislation, the Committee on Official Language, and the Business Advisory Committee from 1985–87; a member of the Rules Committee from 1987–89; a member of the Consultative Committee, the Department of Atomic Energy, Space, Electronics, Ocean Development and the Ministry of Science and Technology in 1990.

Social activities

Chavan was the founder of the Polytechnic Engineering College in Karad and she started the first Montessori School in Karad in 1951. In addition to this, she started the Mahila Mandal Movement in 1950 in Karad. Later, in 1973, she founded the All India Women's Cricket Association.

Death
Chavan died on 8 July 2003. She and her husband both died on 8 July, in different years.

References 

1918 births
2003 deaths
Women in Maharashtra politics
People from Karad
Indian National Congress politicians from Maharashtra
Lok Sabha members from Maharashtra
Chavan Premala
India MPs 1971–1977
India MPs 1977–1979
India MPs 1984–1989
Marathi politicians
20th-century Indian women politicians
20th-century Indian politicians
India MPs 1989–1991
Women members of the Lok Sabha
Women members of the Rajya Sabha